Breckenridge Township may refer to the following townships in the United States:

 Breckenridge Township, Wilkin County, Minnesota
 Breckenridge Township, Caldwell County, Missouri